Prunus alabamensis, the Alabama cherry or Alabama black cherry, is an uncommon North American species of shrub or tree native to the southeastern United States (Alabama, Florida, Georgia, South Carolina).

The leaves are thick, broadly egg-shaped, dull green on the upper surface and light green on the underside.

References

External links 
 

alabamensis
Plants described in 1913
Flora of the Southeastern United States
Flora without expected TNC conservation status